Sergei Sergeievich Salazkin (1862–1932) was a biochemist and academic; in 1917 he served in the Russian Provisional Government.

Life
S.S. Salazkin was born on February 26 (March 10), 1862, in Doschatoe in the Russian Empire. He studied physics and mathematics at the University of St. Petersburg and medicine at the University of Kiev, graduating in 1891. From 1898 to 1911 he was a professor at the Women's Medical Institute in St. Petersburg.

Salazkin was broadly sympathetic to liberal and progressive political causes but did not formally join any political party. Nevertheless, in 1917, he was briefly catapulted into the political arena, serving as non-party Minister of Education in the Russian Provisional Government during the third coalition. After this government was overthrown in the October Revolution, Salazkin withdrew from politics and resumed his academic career.

From 1918 to 1925 he taught at the University of the Crimea in Simferopol, where he also served as rector. Salazkin was a professor at the Leningrad Medical Institute (1925–1931) and worked at the Institute for Experimental Medicine (1926–1931), becoming its director in 1927. Salazkin was noted mainly for his work on the metabolisation of nitrogen. He studied the formation of urea and uric acid and the role of the liver in this process.

Sergei Salazkin died in Leningrad on August 4, 1932.

References

 'S.S. Salazkin' [obituary]. Arkhiv biologicheskikh nauk, 1932, vol. 32, issues 5–6. (Contains a list of Salazkin’s works.)
 Solov’ev, L.T. 'S.S. Salazkin.' Voprosy meditsinskoi khimii, 1949, vol. 1, issues 1–2.
 The Great Soviet Encyclopedia, Third Edition. Moscow, 1970-1979.

1862 births
1932 deaths
Biochemists from the Russian Empire
Ministers of the Russian Provisional Government
People of the Russian Revolution
People from Nizhny Novgorod Oblast